The 2022–23 UMass Minutemen basketball team represents the University of Massachusetts Amherst during the 2022–23 NCAA Division I men's basketball season. The Minutemen are led by first-year head coach Frank Martin and play their home games at the William D. Mullins Memorial Center in Amherst, Massachusetts as members of the Atlantic 10 Conference.

Previous season
The Minutemen finished the 2021–22 season 15–17, 7–11 in A-10 play to finish in 10th place. They defeated George Washington in the second round of the A-10 tournament before losing to Dayton in the quarterfinals.

Offseason

Departures

Incoming transfers

2022 recruiting class

2023 recruiting class

Roster

Schedule and results

|-
!colspan=12 style=| Exhibition

|-
!colspan=9 style=| Non-conference regular season

|-
!colspan=9 style=| A-10 regular season

|-
!colspan=12 style=| A-10 tournament

Source

References

UMass Minutemen basketball seasons
Umass
UMass Minutemen basketball
UMass Minutemen basketball